Paweł Samecki (born 12 March 1958 in Łódź) is a Polish economist and served as the European Commissioner for Regional Policy (2009–10). He is married and has two children.

References

|-

1958 births
Polish European Commissioners
Living people
Polish economists
Writers from Łódź